Jennifer Howard is a Canadian politician and political staffer. She is currently chief of staff to Jagmeet Singh, the leader of the federal New Democratic Party. She was previously a member of the Legislative Assembly of Manitoba, first elected in the 2007 provincial election in the electoral district of Fort Rouge. Howard is a member of the New Democratic Party.

Howard was born and raised in Brandon, where she graduated from Brandon University; she was the federal New Democratic Party candidate in Brandon—Souris in the 1997 election, coming fourth; Progressive Conservative candidate Rick Borotsik won. She moved to Winnipeg in 1998.

Prior to her election to the Legislative Assembly, Howard was employed as policy advisor to Premier of Manitoba Gary Doer on health care issues and as executive director of the Women's Health Clinic. She has also served on the boards of the College of Registered Nurses of Manitoba, the Canadian Centre for Policy Alternatives (Manitoba), the Rainbow Resource Centre and the University of Winnipeg's Board of Regents. She was named a Woman of Distinction in 1999 by the Brandon YWCA. She has also received a Community Builder Award from the Lambda Business and Professional Club of Winnipeg, an organization of gay and lesbian businesses and professionals.

Howard was elected as MLA for Fort Rouge in 2007. She served as vice-chair of the Public Accounts Committee. In November 2009, she was appointed the Minister of Labour and Immigration, Minister responsible for Persons with Disabilities and the Status of Women, and Minister charged with the administration of The Workers Compensation Act.

Howard resigned her cabinet position on November 3, 2014, along with Theresa Oswald, Erin Selby, Stan Struthers, and Andrew Swan due to concerns about Premier Greg Selinger's leadership. She remained an NDP MLA after her resignation from cabinet but did not seek re-election in 2016.

Electoral record

References

New Democratic Party of Manitoba MLAs
Women MLAs in Manitoba
Year of birth missing (living people)
Living people
Members of the Executive Council of Manitoba
Brandon University alumni
Finance ministers of Manitoba
Politicians from Brandon, Manitoba
Politicians from Winnipeg
Lesbian politicians
Canadian LGBT people in provincial and territorial legislatures
Women government ministers of Canada
21st-century Canadian politicians
21st-century Canadian women politicians
Female finance ministers
21st-century Canadian LGBT people